In music, Op. 135 stands for Opus number 135. Compositions that are assigned this number include:

 Beethoven – String Quartet No. 16
 Schumann – Gedichte der Königin Maria Stuart
 Shostakovich – Symphony No. 14